Arthur Vesey Meade, 5th Earl of Clanwilliam,  (14 January 1873 – 23 January 1953), styled Lord Donore between 1905 and 1907, was a British Army officer and politician.

Arthur Meade was the second, but eldest surviving, son of Admiral of the Fleet Richard Meade, 4th Earl of Clanwilliam, and Elizabeth, daughter of Sir Arthur Kennedy GCMG CB, governor of various colonies including Queensland, Hong Kong and Vancouver Island.

Military career
He was educated at Eton and joined the Royal Horse Guards. On the outbreak of the Second Boer War, he served with his regiment in South Africa, becoming a captain in 1900. He was mentioned in despatches (31 March 1900), and was severely wounded, after which he served as Assistant Provost Marshal and Staff Captain. In early 1902 he was seconded to serve with the 30th Battalion, Imperial Yeomanry, as second-in-command with the temporary rank of major. The battalion left Southampton for South Africa in early May, but arrived after the end of hostilities the following month. Meade left South Africa shortly thereafter, on the SS Sardinia, which arrived at Southampton in October 1902. After a short time in India as an extra ADC to the viceroy, Lord Curzon, he returned to England in 1904 and served as adjutant of the Royal Horse Guards until 1907, retiring and becoming a captain on the Reserve of Officers on his marriage in 1909. Since the death of his brother in 1905 he had borne the courtesy title Lord Donore, and two years later, upon the death of his father, he became the fifth Earl of Clanwilliam.

Later life
After his retirement, he divided his time between his property in Ireland (Montalto, Ballynahinch, co. Down) and London. When war broke out in 1914 he returned to the Army and served in France with his regiment from 1915 to 1919 with distinction, being mentioned in dispatches and gaining the Military Cross. On returning to London he succeeded Lord Kintore as chairman of the Carlton Club.

During the 1939–45 war he was for some time an unpaid assistant Whip in the House of Lords with a seat on the Front Bench. Although not a very frequent speaker in the Upper Chamber, he was a valuable member of committees, both as chairman and member.

Family
He married in 1909 Muriel, daughter of Russell Stephenson and widow of the Hon. Oliver Howard. She died in June 1952. There were one son and two daughters of the marriage, and the title devolved upon the son, Major John Meade, 6th Earl of Clanwilliam (1914–1989). Clanwilliam died on 23 January 1953 at his home in Bagshot, Surrey.

References

External links

1873 births
1953 deaths
Royal Horse Guards officers
British Army personnel of the Second Boer War
Deputy Lieutenants of Down
People educated at Eton College
British Army personnel of World War I
Recipients of the Military Cross
People from Bagshot
Imperial Yeomanry officers
Place of birth missing
Earls of Clanwilliam